The following lists events that happened during 1947 in New Zealand.

Population 
 Estimated population as of 31 December: 1,817,500
 Increase since 31 December 1946: 36,300 (2.04%)
 Males per 100 females: 100.3

Incumbents

Regal and viceregal 
Head of State – George VI
Governor-General – Lieutenant-General The Lord Freyberg VC GCMG KCB KBE DSO

Government 
The 28th New Zealand Parliament continued, with the Labour Party in government.

Speaker of the House – Robert McKeen (Labour)
Prime Minister – Peter Fraser
Minister of Finance – Walter Nash
Minister of Foreign Affairs – Peter Fraser
Attorney-General – Rex Mason
Chief Justice – Sir Humphrey O'Leary

Parliamentary opposition 
 Leader of the Opposition –  Sidney Holland (National Party).

Main centre leaders
Mayor of Auckland – John Allum
Mayor of Hamilton – Harold Caro
Mayor of Wellington – Will Appleton
Mayor of Christchurch – Ernest Andrews
Mayor of Dunedin – Donald Cameron

Events 
 19 January –The TSMV , completing her first trans-tasman crossing since World War II, runs aground on Barrett Reef at the entrance to Wellington Harbour. All 400 passengers are safely evacuated. The ship is refloated on 6 February but is out of service for a further 22 months.
 6 February – First annual Waitangi Day ceremony held by New Zealand Navy in grounds of Treaty house, Waitangi.
 February – Holy Name Seminary, Christchurch (Catholic) established.
 6 March – The New Zealand Symphony Orchestra performs for the first time
 1–29 April – A series of non-violent mutinies occur aboard ships and bases of the Royal New Zealand Navy
4 April – Horahora Power Station is decommissioned as the filling of Lake Karapiro floods the station.
21 April – The first generator at Karapiro Power Station is commissioned.
 18 November – 41 people die in a fire in the Ballantyne's department store in Christchurch.
 1 December – Clothing rationing, introduced in May 1942, is abolished.

Arts and literature

See 1947 in art, 1947 in literature

Music

See: 1947 in music

Radio

See: Public broadcasting in New Zealand

Film

See: :Category:1947 film awards, 1947 in film, List of New Zealand feature films, Cinema of New Zealand, :Category:1947 films

Sport

Archery
National Champions (Postal Shoot)
Open Men – W. Burton (Gisborne)
Open Women – G. Norris (Dunedin)

Athletics
 George Bromley wins his first national title in the men's marathon, clocking 2:58:54 in Auckland.

Basketball
The first interprovincial championship for women is held.

Interprovincial champions
Men – Auckland
Women – Wellington

Chess
 The 54th National Chess Championship was held in Palmerston North, and was won by T. Lepviikman of Wellington (his 2nd win).

Cricket

Horse racing

Harness racing
 New Zealand Trotting Cup – Highland Fling
 Auckland Trotting Cup – Single Direct

Lawn bowls
The national outdoor lawn bowls championships are held in Wellington.
 Men's singles champion – S. Vella (Onehunga Bowling Club)
 Men's pair champions – W.R. Hawkins, Phil Exelby (skip) (Frankton Bowling Club)
 Men's fours champions – E.H. Crowley, E. Crowley, V.F. Hurlstone, G.A. Crowley (skip) (Tolaga Bay Bowling Club)

Rugby

Rugby league
New Zealand national rugby league team beat Wales 28-20

Soccer
 A South African team visited New Zealand and played four internationals:
 28 June, Christchurch: NZ 5–6 South Africa
 5 July, Dunedin: NZ 0–6 South Africa
 12 July, Wellington: NZ 3–8	South Africa
 19 July, Auckland: NZ 1–4 South Africa
 The Chatham Cup is won by Waterside of Wellington who beat Technical Old Boys of Christchurch 2–1 in the final.
 Provincial league champions:
	Auckland:	North Shore United
	Canterbury:	Western
	Hawke's Bay:	Napier HSOB
	Nelson:	Nelson United
	Otago:	Mosgiel AFC
	South Canterbury:	Northern Hearts
	Southland:	Invercargill Thistle
	Taranaki:	Albion
	Waikato: Claudelands Rovers
	Wanganui:	Technical College Old Boys
	Wellington:	Wellington Marist

Births
 8 January: Luke Williams, wrestler
 16 January: Gavan Herlihy, politician.
 19 February: Tim Shadbolt, politician.
 9 March
 Keri Hulme, writer. (died 2021)
 John Lister, golfer.
 6 May: Alan Dale, actor.
 6 May (in England): Carl Doy, musician and composer.
 6 May: Andrew Roberts, cricketer.
 20 May: Margaret Wilson, politician.
 27 May: Glenn Turner, cricketer.
 1 June: Gaylene Preston, filmmaker
 6 June: Patrick Power, tenor.
 22 June: Murray Webb, cricketer and caricature artist.
 27 August: John Morrison, cricketer.
 2 September: Jim Richards, motor racing driver.
 13 September: Annette King, politician.
 22 September: David Trist, cricket player and coach.
 18 December: Marian Hobbs, politician.
 Bill Hammond, painter.
 Michael Wintringham, public servant.
:Category:1947 births

Deaths
 17 January: Kahupake Rongonui, tribal leader.
 10 February: Winter Hall, silent movie actor.
 11 March: Duncan McGregor, rugby player.
 24 April: Patrick O'Regan, lawyer, politician and judge.
 13 May: Frances Hodgkins, painter.
 17 May: George Forbes, 22nd Prime minister of New Zealand.
 30 June: Robert Frederick Way, trade unionist and activist.
 21 July: Agnes Fabish, domestic servant, farmer and homemaker.
 6 December: Robert Wright, mayor of Wellington and politician.

See also 
 History of New Zealand
 List of years in New Zealand
 Military history of New Zealand
 Timeline of New Zealand history
 Timeline of New Zealand's links with Antarctica
 Timeline of the New Zealand environment

References

External links

 
Years of the 20th century in New Zealand